Fulfordianthus evansii is a species of liverworts in the family Lejeuneaceae. It is found in Belize, Costa Rica, possibly Guatemala, and possibly Panama. Its natural habitat is subtropical or tropical moist lowland forests.

References

Lejeuneaceae
Vulnerable plants
Taxonomy articles created by Polbot